Francis James  (1559–1616), of Wells and Bristol, was an English politician.

He was a Member (MP) of the Parliament of England for Dorchester in 1593, for Corfe Castle in 1597, for Minehead in 1601 and for Wareham in 1604. His brother, William James, was bishop of Durham.

References

1559 births
1616 deaths
People from Wells, Somerset
Politicians from Bristol
Members of the Parliament of England for Dorchester
English MPs 1593
English MPs 1597–1598
English MPs 1601
English MPs 1604–1611
Members of the Parliament of England for Minehead
Members of the Parliament of England (pre-1707) for Wareham